Fidelis Cybersecurity is a cybersecurity company focused on threat detection, hunting, and targeted response of advanced threats and data breaches. Among its customers includes IBM, the United States Army and the United States Department of Commerce.

Fidelis offers network security appliances, which include the company's patented Deep Session Inspection architecture. The company claims speed and accuracy in network traffic inspection among its technical differentiators.

In August 2012, General Dynamics announced an agreement to acquire Fidelis into its Advanced Information Systems division.

In April 2015, Marlin Equity Partners entered into an agreement with General Dynamics to acquire Fidelis Cybersecurity Solutions with the intention of creating a new advanced threat defense service.

In May 2015, the Wall Street Journal reported that Fidelis acquired Resolution1, an incident response and endpoint detection and response provider. 

In February 2016, the New York Times reported that Fidelis had been hired to provide the hardware and software to monitor the University of California network.

After acquiring deception technology vendor TopSpin, Fidelis launched its Deception product in January 2018.

Skyview Capital, a global private investment firm, acquired Fidelis in December 2019.

References

External links
Official site

Computer security companies
Companies established in 2002
2002 establishments in the United States